A campino is a cattle herder in the Portuguese region of Ribatejo.

Campinos work on horse-back, using a long pole (a pampilho or lance) to manage and direct the herd.

Campinos are also known for their distinctive attire, which consists of a green and red stocking cap with a tassel, white shirt with full sleeves, red vest, short dark trousers and white stockings. This is similar to the traditional attire of the forcado, the difference being mainly in the colours.

Portuguese culture
Pastoralists
Animal husbandry occupations
Horse history and evolution
Horse-related professions and professionals